Des Imagistes: An Anthology, edited by Ezra Pound and published in 1914, was the first anthology of the Imagism movement.  It was published in The Glebe in February 1914, and later that year as a book by Charles and Albert Boni in New York, and Harold Monro's Poetry Bookshop in London.

The eleven authors featured were: Richard Aldington, Skipwith Cannell, John Cournos, H. D., F. S. Flint, Ford Madox Ford, James Joyce, Amy Lowell, Ezra Pound, Allen Upward, and William Carlos Williams.

Aldington later wrote regarding the title: "What Ezra thought that meant remains a mystery, unless the word "Anthologie" was assumed to precede it. Amy Lowell's anthologies were called Some Imagist Poets, so she may have supposed that Ezra thought Des Imagistes meant 'Quelques Imagistes.' But why a French title for a collection of poems by a bunch of young American and English authors? Search me. Ezra liked foreign titles."

Notes

External links
 
 Des Imagistes - .pdf of original book publication in New York by Albert and Charles Boni, bearing the inscription, Lloyd R. Morris, 1914.
Des Imagistes in The Glebe at The Modernist Journals Project
The Glebe Volume 1, February 1914 (facsimile) - Princeton Blue Mountain collection
Des Imagistes at The Modernist Journals Project: includes New York and London editions of the 1914 volume
Some Imagist Poets (1915) at The Modernist Journals Project
Some Imagist Poets (1916) at The Modernist Journals Project
Some Imagist Poets (1917) at The Modernist Journals Project

1914 poetry books
1914 anthologies
American poetry anthologies
Works by Ezra Pound
Works originally published in American magazines
Works originally published in literary magazines
Imagism